Sankoo is a town in the Kargil district of the union territory of Ladakh in India. The township is 42 km south of Kargil city. Sankoo is located in a bowl-shaped valley drained by large tributary streams of the Suru River, and the Nakpochu river. As the richest  and most verdant valley in Ladakh, Sankoo Valley is known as the Ladakh's Gulmarg ("meadow of flowers"). It is located in the Sankoo tehsil.

Administration

There is one CHC hospital and one secondary school, Aga Syed Haider Rizvi Memorial Higher Secondary School. Some of villages Sankoo are Sangra, Stakpa, Umba, Lankarchay, Thasgam, Barso, Farona and Nagma Kousar.

Demand for new district

In February 2020, various youth, religious and spolitical parties organized a protest of nearly 3,000 people against the creation of a new 14,000 sq-km Muslim majority district of Sankoo out of Kargil because it remains cut off from the Kargil and rest of India during winter snowfall. It had 40,000 or more than 25% population of Kargil district in 2011.

Climate

Summers are mild and warm in Sankoo, but the winters are extremely cold and harsh. Temperatures are most comfortable in April and September. As a result of global warming, the most widely reported impact is a rapid shrinking of glaciers, which has profound future implications for downstream water resources. Some of these diminishing glaciers are the Nangma Serpo glacier, Batacho glacier, Umba Glacier and Gangshanmo. A study of these glaciers has yet to be done.

Geography

Sankoo is a developing township with a small bazaar and numerous villages. Dense plantations of poplars, willows, myricaria and wild roses fill the bowl-shaped valley, giving it the ambience of a man-made forest tucked within mountain ramparts.  Two side valleys drained by large tributary streams of the Suru river, the Kartse flowing from the east and the Nakpochu descending from the west, open up on either side of the expanse.

Tourism 

Picnickers come to the area from Kargil town and other places. There is also a place of pilgrimage, the shrine of a Muslim scholar-saint, Sayed Mir Hashim, who was invited from Kashmir to impart the religious teachings of the region's Buddhist ruler, Thi-Namgyal of the Suru principality, following his conversion to Islam in the 16th century. The shrine is in the village of Karpo-Kharon on the outskirts of Sankoo.

See also
 Namgyal

Notes

References

Villages in Sankoo tehsil